Ochetomyrmex is a Neotropical genus of ants in the subfamily Myrmicinae.

Distribution
The genus is restricted to the Neotropical region, where the ants nest in soil or in the leaf litter. Ochetomyrmex neopolitus is known from northern South America, from Colombia and Guyana to the Brazilian Amazon. Ochetomyrmex semipolitus has a wider distribution, ranging from Guyana and Brazil to northern Argentina.

Species
Ochetomyrmex neopolitus Fernández, 2003
Ochetomyrmex semipolitus Mayr, 1878

References

External links

Myrmicinae
Ant genera
Hymenoptera of South America